Oliver Francis Reginald Copestake (1 September 1921 – 1953) was an English professional footballer who played in the Football League for Mansfield Town.

References

1921 births
1953 deaths
English footballers
Association football inside forwards
English Football League players
Mansfield Town F.C. players
Boston United F.C. players
Heanor Town F.C. players